Southend-on-Sea City Council is the local authority of the Southend-on-Sea district in Essex, England. It is a unitary authority, having the powers of a non-metropolitan county and district council combined. It is a member of the East of England Local Government Association. It is based at Southend Civic Centre in Southend-on-Sea.

Politics

Seventeen wards each return three councillors, a total of 51. Councillors serve four years and one third of the council is elected each year, followed by one year without election. The current composition of the council is (as of February 2023):

The council has been run by a rainbow coalition of Labour, Independent Group and Liberal Democrat councillors since June 2019. The council had previously been run by the same coalition between May 2014 and May 2016. Apart from these occasions, since the 2000 election the council had been run by a Conservative administration.

Performance
In 2007,  Southend Borough Council was criticised as one of the worst financially managed local authorities in England by the Audit Commission report for 2006/7, one of three to gain only one of four stars, the others being Liverpool and the Isles of Scilly.

In March 2012, Southend Borough Council was awarded the title of 'Council of the Year 2012' by the Local Government Chronicle.

Arms

References

External links

Unitary authority councils of England
Local authorities in Essex
Southend-on-Sea (district)
Local education authorities in England
Billing authorities in England
Leader and cabinet executives